Raju Ban Gaya Gentleman is a 1992 Indian Hindi-language romantic comedy film directed by Aziz Mirza starring Nana Patekar, Amrita Singh, Shahrukh Khan and Juhi Chawla. Khan plays Raju, a young Diploma Holder in Civil Engineering from Darjeeling who comes to Bombay hoping to become a successful engineer. The film emerged as a commercial success. The movie plot is loosely inspired by the 1987 movie The Secret of My Success and the Raj Kapoor classic Shree 420 (1955). The rights to this film are owned by Khan's Red Chillies Entertainment.

At the 38th Filmfare Awards, Raju Ban Gaya Gentleman won Best Screenplay (Mirza and Lalwani), in addition to a Best Supporting Actor nomination for Patekar.

Plot 

Raj Mathur is a young Diploma holder in civil engineering from Darjeeling who comes to Bombay with only one ambition — to become a big engineer. In Bombay, he arrives in a lower-middle-class locality in search of a distant relative, only to discover he has left years before. He spends the night at a temple, where he meets a philosophical streetside performer Jai, who becomes a close friend and gives him a place to stay.

With no connections and no experience, he finds it hard to get a job in the city until a beautiful girl Renu, finds him a job as a trainee with the construction company where she works as a secretary to Chabbria. They eventually fall in love with each other.

As he becomes successful he gets the attention of Chhabria's daughter Sapna. They spend more and more time together and he soon gets caught up in the rich and glamorous lifestyle. Sapna has fallen in love with Raju, but when she finds out that he loves Renu, she is heartbroken.

In the meantime, Raju's enemies are conspiring against him and they collapse a bridge which was under Raju's supervision. He gets the blame and soon realizes that the glamorous world of the rich is not what he wants. In the end, Raju decides to leave. Most people were asking Jai when Raju would come back. Jai told them when he turns his head around and looks at Renu, he will have no choice but to come back. Just a second earlier, Jai says "Palat" (meaning turn) then Raju turns and looks at Renu. He and Renu finally get reunited again.

Cast 
Nana Patekar as Jai
Shahrukh Khan as Raj Mathur "Raju"
Juhi Chawla as Renu Singh
Amrita Singh as Sapna Chhabria
Navin Nischol as Lalkishan Chhabria
Sameer Chitre as Deepak Malhotra
Achyut Potdar as Joshi
Neeraj Vora as Abdul
Ajit Vachani as Malhotra
Anjan Srivastav as Saxena
Amrit Patel as Gullu Dada
Lalit Tiwari as Rafique
Vivek Vaswani as Lovechand Kukreja
Ravi Patwardhan as Prosecuting Lawyer
Pramod Moutho

Soundtrack 
The entire composition and background score was composed by Jatin–Lalit. Audio is available on Tips Music Films. The music of this album was a hit with songs like "Laveria Hua", "Dil Hai Mera Deewana" and "Seene Mein Dil Hai". Most of the songs are sung by Kumar Sanu, along with Alka Yagnik, Sudesh Bhonsle, Sadhana Sargam and Jolly Mukherjee.

Production 
G. P. Sippy initially wanted to cast a better-known actor than Shahrukh Khan who was still a newcomer at the time. But the co-producer Vivek Vaswani eventually convinced him. However, Sippy decided to cap the budget of the film at only ₹0.6 crore. Vaswani talked to Juhi Chawla into playing the female lead. Chawla was an established actress at the time. Vaswani convinced her to take the role by promising that Khan was the "next Aamir Khan". Chawla had heard of Khan but had never met or seen him. She was taken aback by his skinny frame and untidy hair when they first met on the sets. That night, she called Vaswani and yelled, "Eeek! Is this the next Aamir?!"

Khan got married during the making of the film. Still struggling financially, he borrowed suits from the film's costume department for the wedding. Aziz Mirza and Vaswani attended the ceremony.

Box office 
In India, the film grossed . This made it 1992's 22nd highest-grossing film in India.

Raju Ban Gaya Gentleman was released in Japan on 17 May 1997. While Indian parallel cinema, including Satyajit Ray's Bengali films such as The Apu Trilogy, was known in Japan, Raju Ban Gaya Gentleman introduced the commercial masala film style, which was well received by Japanese audiences, with the film becoming a commercial success in the country. This sparked a short-lived boom in Indian films released in Japan, for the next two years, paving the way for the Japanese success of Rajinikanth's Muthu (1995) in 1998.

Awards 
38th Filmfare Awards:

Won
Best Screenplay – Aziz Mirza and Manoj Lalwani
Nominated
Best Supporting Actor – Nana Patekar

References

External links 
 
 Raju Ban Gaya Gentleman Full Movie at Filmywrep

1990s Hindi-language films
Films set in Mumbai
1992 films
Films scored by Jatin–Lalit
Films directed by Aziz Mirza